Cape Trafalgar is a headland in the Province of Cádiz in the southwest of Spain. The 1805 naval Battle of Trafalgar, in which the Royal Navy commanded by Admiral Horatio Nelson decisively defeated Napoleon's combined Spanish and French fleet, took place just off the cape. 

Cape Trafalgar lies on the shore of the Atlantic Ocean, northwest of the Strait of Gibraltar. The International Hydrographic Organization defines the western limit of the strait and the Mediterranean Sea as a line that joins Cape Trafalgar to the north with Cape Spartel to the south. 

Etymology
The name is of Arabic origin, deriving either from Taraf al-Ghar ( 'cape of the cave/laurel'), or from Taraf al-Gharb ( 'cape of the west').  In both cases, taraf means 'edge' or 'extremity' and refers to a promontory.  In modern Arabic, however, the place is sometimes re-transcribed as al-Taraf al-Aghar.

Archaeology 
In May 2021, 2,000-year-old Roman baths emerged from the sand dunes of Cape Trafalgar, including entire walls, windows and doors.

See also
Trafalgar Square

References

External links

Libro de Faros (todos los faros de España)

Trafalgar
Trafalgar
Shipping Forecast areas